Syodontinae is a group of dinocephalian therapsids. It is one of two subfamilies in the family Anteosauridae, the other being Anteosaurinae. They are known from the Middle Permian Period of what is now Russia and South Africa. One of the best known syodontines is Syodon from Russia. The South African form Australosyodon, is one of the earliest known Gondwanan anteosaurs.

Description
Syodontines lack the boss on the lower jaw that characterises the related anteosaurines, and they have often been considered more primitive in this respect.

Classification
Below is a cladogram showing syodontine relationships from a 2012 phylogenetic study of anteosaurians:

References

Anteosaurs
Guadalupian first appearances
Guadalupian extinctions
Prehistoric animal subfamilies
Therapsid subfamilies